Emel Heinreich (born 27 June 1962) is a Turkish actress, author and film-director who works in Austria.

Filmography 
 1986 Wir die Fremden
 1989 Du bist eine
 1989 Das Meer und die Frauen
 1991 Das Blut der Rose
 1995 Tujutaksu
 1995 Kodoks Dream
 1996 Hier, dort, irgendwo
 1996 Du wirst essen die Frucht meines Herzens
 1997 Mimpi Manis
 1998 Wasserhaus
 2009 Tatort
 2009 Kommissar Rex

References

External links

 Cocon-Kultur Verein
 Improvisation zu Mimpi Manis
 DARB-I FETIH, "Projekt von Emel Heinreich und Rupert Huber"
 "Hintergrundinformation zum Projekt Hochzeit"
 Tatort-Fundus "Baum der Erlösung"
 Clip zu "Mein Leben mir Selbst - Eigenproduktion Cocon-Kultur

1962 births
Living people
People from Kayseri
Turkish expatriates in Austria
Turkish television actresses